The museum of decorative arts in Isfahan was founded in 1995. More than 3000 artworks from the Safavid and Qajar era are kept in the museum. The building of the museum belongs to the era of Abbas I. The building was constructed during the era of Abbas I as a part  of Charbagh Palace. There is a multi-storey tower beside the museum, which belongs to the Qajar era. The tower was used at first as watchtower and then as jail. The tower does not have any kind of decorations, bit it is regarded as a notable relic of the Safavid architecture.

References 

Art museums and galleries in Iran
Museum of Decorative Arts, Isfahan
Art museums established in 1995
Museum of Decorative Arts, Isfahan
Decorative arts museums